This is a list of Botswana women's international footballers who have played for the Botswana women's national football team.

Players

See also 
 Botswana women's national football team

References 

 
International footballers
Footballers
Botswana
Football in Botswana
Association football player non-biographical articles